Hildegarde Neil Blessed (born 29 July 1939), also credited as Hildegard Neil, is an English actress.

Career
Born in London, and raised in South Africa, she first appeared on television in a BBC schools' television production of Julius Caesar in 1963 and after that appeared mostly as a guest artiste in a variety of television series over the last 40 years. She has also appeared in several films and on stage, both in the West End and touring.

Personal life
She is married to actor Brian Blessed and has a daughter with him, Rosalind, who is also an actress and represented by the same agent as her mother. On 23 May 2009, Neil appeared with her husband on the ITV entertainment show, All Star Mr & Mrs, on which it was established that she is a keen Liverpool F.C. supporter.

Stage appearances
 She spent a season at the Royal Shakespeare Company playing a variety of roles including "Gertrude" in Hamlet.
 She played Lady Macbeth in Ewan Hooper's production of Macbeth at the Greenwich Theatre, which opened on 18 February 1971.
 She directed Roan School for Girls' production of Much ado about nothing in 1971.

Filmography

Film

Television

References

External links

1939 births
Living people
20th-century English actresses
21st-century English actresses
Actresses from London
English film actresses
English stage actresses
English television actresses